Charvadeh (also Romanized as Cherū Deh; also known as Charvadeh-e Pā‘īn) is a village in Yeylaqi-ye Ardeh Rural District, Pareh Sar District, Rezvanshahr County, Gilan Province, Iran. At the 2006 census, its population was 186, in 44 families.

References 

Populated places in Rezvanshahr County